Ahamada Haoulata (born 6 May 1975) is a Comorian athlete who competed at the 1996 Summer Olympic Games in the Women's 400m. She finished 7th in her heat and failed to advance. She was the first woman to represent the Comoros at the Olympics.

References

External links 
 
 
 

Athletes (track and field) at the 1996 Summer Olympics
Olympic athletes of the Comoros
1975 births
Comorian female sprinters
Living people
Olympic female sprinters